Lennox Blackmoore (born July 10, 1950) is a Guyanese professional light/light welter/welter/light middle/middleweight boxer of the 1970s and 80s.

Lennox Blackmoore is the uncle of the boxer Shaun George.

Growing up in East La Penitence, his main interest was football. His first and only amateur bout was in 1971, and he began his professional career at 23 in 1974. He went on to win the Guyanese lightweight title and Guyanese light middleweight title. At 27, he won the 1977 Commonwealth lightweight title in Lagos, and upon his return to Guyana he was celebrated by the Forbes Burnham government. He was a challenger for the World Boxing Association (WBA) World light welterweight title against Aaron Pryor, and World Boxing Council (WBC) FECARBOX light welterweight title against Antonio Cervantes. Blackmoore also fought, and lost to, Steve Hearon.

He retired from boxing in 1986, and went on to train other boxers, including Julio César Green, Jill Matthews, and Åsa Sandell. He works as private boxing trainer in New York city.

The Guyana Boxing Association (GBA) inaugurated the Lennox Blackmoore Intermediate Championships in 2015.  GBA honors notable local boxers by naming tournaments after them.

References

External links

1950 births
Sportspeople from Georgetown, Guyana
Light-middleweight boxers
Lightweight boxers
Light-welterweight boxers
Living people
Middleweight boxers
Welterweight boxers
Guyanese male boxers